Tachilek Airport or Tachileik Airport  is an airport serving Tachilek (Tachileik), a town in the Shan State of eastern Myanmar.

Airlines and destinations

References

External links
 

Airports in Myanmar
Buildings and structures in Shan State